First party may refer to:

First Party of Tasmania, a political party in Australia
First-party developer in video game development

See also

Third party (disambiguation)
First Party System of the United States
First-party logistics providers
First-party leads, in sales